Carlijn Marjolijn de Groot (born 10 September 1986) is a former Dutch international cricketer whose career for the Dutch national side spanned from 2007 to 2012.

De Groot was born in Schiedam, and played her club cricket for Hermes-DVS, which is based in the city. She made her international debut for the Netherlands in August 2007, playing two One Day International (ODI) matches against the touring South Africans. Her Twenty20 International debut came the following year, against the West Indies. In total, de Groot played fifteen ODIs and eight Twenty20 Internationals before the Netherlands lost its status in those formats in late 2011. Her final international match to date came against Ireland at the 2012 ICC Europe T20 Qualifier.

References

1986 births
Dutch women cricketers
Living people
Netherlands women One Day International cricketers
Netherlands women Twenty20 International cricketers
Groot
Groot
20th-century Dutch women
21st-century Dutch women